Enyew Mekonnen (born 7 April 1994) is an Ethiopian long-distance runner. 
In 2019, he competed in the senior men's race at the 2019 IAAF World Cross Country Championships held in Aarhus, Denmark. He finished in 25th place.

References

External links 
 

Living people
1994 births
Place of birth missing (living people)
Ethiopian male long-distance runners
Ethiopian male cross country runners
21st-century Ethiopian people